Franciszek Malinowski (8 or 10 October 1897 – 27 or 28 February 1944) was a Polish activist, communist and politician.

Franciszek Malinowski was executed on 27 or 28 February 1944, aged 46, at the Buchenwald concentration camp in Weimar, Thuringia, Nazi Germany.

References

1897 births
1944 deaths
People from Sokołów County
Polish Workers' Party politicians
Communist Party of Poland politicians
Politicians who died in Nazi concentration camps
Polish people who died in Buchenwald concentration camp